Użmauda  is a village in the administrative district of Gmina Wiżajny, within Suwałki County, Podlaskie Voivodeship, in north-eastern Poland, close to the border with Lithuania.

The village has a population of 24.

References

Villages in Suwałki County